Bena is a city in Cass County, Minnesota, United States. The population was 116 at the 2010 census. It is part of the Brainerd Micropolitan Statistical Area.

History
A post office called Bena has been in operation since 1898. Bena is a type of bird mentioned in the poem The Song of Hiawatha. The Ojibwe word bina' is the word for partridge, a very common bird in this area. 

Late in World War II, a logging camp manned by prisoners of war was located at the site of an old CCC camp near Bena. Two German POWs escaped from the camp in 1944 for a short period.

Geography
Bena is located along U.S. Highway 2 and Cass County Road 8.

Demographics

2010 census
As of the census of 2010, there were 116 people, 43 households, and 24 families living in the city. The racial makeup of the city was 19.8% White, 69.0% Native American, and 11.2% from two or more races. Hispanic or Latino of any race were 0.9% of the population.

There were 43 households, of which 37.2% had children under the age of 18 living with them, 18.6% were married couples living together, 20.9% had a female householder with no husband present, 16.3% had a male householder with no wife present, and 44.2% were non-families. 41.9% of all households were made up of individuals, and 16.3% had someone living alone who was 65 years of age or older. The average household size was 2.70 and the average family size was 3.79.

The median age in the city was 30.5 years. 32.8% of residents were under the age of 18; 8.6% were between the ages of 18 and 24; 22.5% were from 25 to 44; 23.3% were from 45 to 64; and 12.9% were 65 years of age or older. The gender makeup of the city was 48.3% male and 51.7% female.

2000 census
As of the census of 2000, there were 110 people, 48 households, and 31 families living in the city. The racial makeup of the city was 24.55% White, 70.00% Native American, and 5.45% from two or more races.

There were 48 households, out of which 27.1% had children under the age of 18 living with them, 31.3% were married couples living together, 22.9% had a female householder with no husband present, and 35.4% were non-families. 33.3% of all households were made up of individuals, and 10.4% had someone living alone who was 65 years of age or older. The average household size was 2.29 and the average family size was 2.90.

In the city, the population was spread out, with 27.3% under the age of 18, 10.9% from 18 to 24, 19.1% from 25 to 44, 25.5% from 45 to 64, and 17.3% who were 65 years of age or older. The median age was 36 years. For every 100 females, there were 103.7 males. For every 100 females age 18 and over, there were 105.1 males.

The median income for a household in the city was $11,563, and the median income for a family was $6,563. Males had a median income of $17,083 versus $19,063 for females. The per capita income for the city was $7,619. There were 73.7% of families and 58.0% of the population living below the poverty line, including 95.0% of under eighteens and 26.7% of those over 64.

Education

It is in the Cass Lake-Bena Schools district.

The tribal K-12 school Bug-O-Nay-Ge-Shig School has a Bena address but is not in the city limits.

References

External links
Bena Photo Gallery

Cities in Cass County, Minnesota
Cities in Minnesota
Brainerd, Minnesota micropolitan area
Minnesota populated places on the Mississippi River